Croydon station may refer to:

In Australia:
Croydon Station, a pastoral lease and sheep station in the Pilbarra area of Western Australia
 Croydon railway station, Adelaide, Australia
 Croydon railway station, Melbourne, Australia
 Croydon railway station, Queensland, a stop on the Gulflander train
 Croydon railway station, Sydney, Australia
 West Croydon railway station, Adelaide, Australia

In the United Kingdom:
 East Croydon station, the main railway station in Croydon, London
 West Croydon station, in Croydon, London
 South Croydon railway station, in Croydon, London

In the United States:
Croydon station (SEPTA), a SEPTA Regional Rail station in Croydon, Pennsylvania, USA

See also
Croydon (disambiguation)